Diamphotoxin is a toxin produced by larvae and pupae of the beetle genus Diamphidia. Diamphotoxin is a hemolytic, cardiotoxic, and highly labile single-chain polypeptide bound to a protein that protects it from deactivation.

Diamphotoxin increases the permeability of cell membranes of red blood cells. Although this does not affect the normal flow of ions between cells, it allows all small ions to pass through cell membranes easily, which fatally disrupts the cells' ion levels.  Although diamphotoxin has no neurotoxic effect, its hemolytic effect is lethal, and may reduce hemoglobin levels by as much as 75%.

The San people of Southern Africa use diamphotoxin as an arrow poison for hunting game. The toxin paralyses muscles gradually. Large mammals hunted in this way die slowly from a small injection of the poison.

Several leaf beetles species of genus Leptinotarsa produce a similar toxin, leptinotarsin.

See also
Palytoxin - A non-peptide fatty alcohol toxin with similar effects isolated from corals of the genus Palythoa and some marine dinoflagellates

References

Further reading

External links
Diamphotoxin at PubChem. Retrieved 4 July 2013.

Insect toxins
Peptides